Stanley "Bunny" Galazin (1910 – November 12, 1989) was an American football center who played three seasons with the New York Giants of the National Football League. He played college football at Villanova University and attended Keystone Academy in Wyoming, Pennsylvania. He died on November 12, 1989 in his hometown of Nanticoke, Pennsylvania.

References

External links
Just Sports Stats

1910 births
1989 deaths
American football centers
Villanova Wildcats football players
New York Giants players